Bouhanni is a surname. Notable people with the surname include:

 Nacer Bouhanni (born 1990), French cyclist
 Rayane Bouhanni (born 1996), French cyclist, brother of Nacer